Bob Charles (26 December 1941 – 7 March 2014) was an English professional footballer who played as a goalkeeper.

Career
Born in Bursledon, Charles played for Southampton, Weymouth and Hastings United.

References

1941 births
2014 deaths
English footballers
Southampton F.C. players
Weymouth F.C. players
Hastings United F.C. (1948) players
English Football League players
Association football goalkeepers
People from Bursledon